The 2019–20 UEFA Europa League was the 49th season of Europe's secondary club football tournament organised by UEFA, and the 11th season since it was renamed from the UEFA Cup to the UEFA Europa League.

Sevilla defeated Inter Milan in the final, played at the RheinEnergieStadion in Cologne, Germany, 3–2 for a record sixth title in the competition. As winners, Sevilla earned the right to play against Bayern Munich, the winners of the 2019–20 UEFA Champions League, in the 2020 UEFA Super Cup. Since they had already qualified for the 2020–21 UEFA Champions League group stage through their league performance, the berth originally reserved for the Europa League title holders was given to the third-placed team of the 2019–20 Ligue 1 (Rennes), the 5th-ranked association according to next season's access list.

Due to the impact of the COVID-19 pandemic, the tournament was suspended in mid-March 2020 and resumed in August. The quarter-finals onwards were played as a single match knockout ties at neutral venues in Germany (RheinEnergieStadion, MSV-Arena, Merkur Spiel-Arena, Arena AufSchalke) behind closed doors from 10 to 21 August. The video assistant referee (VAR) system was used in the competition from the knockout stage onwards.

As the title holders of the Europa League, Chelsea qualified for the 2019–20 UEFA Champions League, although they had already qualified before the final through their league performance. They were unable to defend their title as they advanced to the Champions League knockout stage, and were eliminated by the ultimate winners Bayern Munich in the round of 16.

Association team allocation
A total of 213 teams from all 55 UEFA member associations participated in the 2019–20 UEFA Europa League. The association ranking based on the UEFA country coefficients was used to determine the number of participating teams for each association:
Associations 1–51 (except Liechtenstein) each had three teams qualify.
Associations 52–54 each had two teams qualify.
Liechtenstein and Kosovo (association 55) each had one team qualify (Liechtenstein organised only a domestic cup and no domestic league; Kosovo as per decision by the UEFA Executive Committee).
Moreover, 55 teams eliminated from the 2019–20 UEFA Champions League were transferred to the Europa League (default number was 57, but 2 fewer teams competed in the 2019–20 UEFA Champions League).

Association ranking
For the 2019–20 UEFA Europa League, the associations were allocated places according to their 2018 UEFA country coefficients, which took into account their performance in European competitions from 2013–14 to 2017–18.

Apart from the allocation based on the country coefficients, associations could have additional teams participating in the Champions League, as noted below:
 – Additional teams transferred from the UEFA Champions League

Distribution
The following is the access list for this season.

Changes were made to the default access list, if any of the teams that qualified for the Europa League via their domestic competitions also qualified for the Champions League as the Champions League or Europa League title holders, or if there were fewer teams transferred from the Champions League due to changes in the Champions League access list. In any case where a spot in the Europa League was vacated, cup winners of the highest-ranked associations in earlier rounds were promoted accordingly.
In the default access list, originally 17 losers from the Champions League first qualifying round were transferred to the Europa League second qualifying round (Champions Path). However, since the Champions League title holders (Liverpool) qualified for the Champions League group stage via their domestic league, only 16 losers from the Champions League first qualifying round were transferred to the Europa League second qualifying round (Champions Path). As a result, only 19 teams entered the Champions Path second qualifying round (one of the losers from the Champions League first qualifying round would be drawn to receive a bye to the third qualifying round).
In the default access list, originally three losers from the Champions League second qualifying round (League Path) were transferred to the Europa League third qualifying round (Main Path). However, since the Europa League title holders (Chelsea) qualified for the Champions League group stage via their domestic league, only two losers from the Champions League second qualifying round (League Path) were transferred to the Europa League third qualifying round (Main Path). As a result, the following changes to the access list were made:
The cup winners of association 18 (Israel) entered the third qualifying round instead of the second qualifying round.
The cup winners of association 25 (Serbia) entered the second qualifying round instead of the first qualifying round.
The cup winners of associations 50 (Wales) and 51 (Faroe Islands) entered the first qualifying round instead of the preliminary round.

Redistribution rules
A Europa League place was vacated when a team qualified for both the Champions League and the Europa League, or qualified for the Europa League by more than one method. When a place was vacated, it was redistributed within the national association by the following rules:
When the domestic cup winners (considered as the "highest-placed" qualifier within the national association with the latest starting round) also qualified for the Champions League, their Europa League place was vacated. As a result, the highest-placed team in the league which had not yet qualified for European competitions qualified for the Europa League, with the Europa League qualifiers which finished above them in the league moving up one "place".
When the domestic cup winners also qualified for the Europa League through league position, their place through the league position was vacated. As a result, the highest-placed team in the league which had not yet qualified for European competitions qualified for the Europa League, with the Europa League qualifiers which finished above them in the league moving up one "place" if possible.
For associations where a Europa League place was reserved for either the League Cup or end-of-season European competition play-offs winners, they always qualified for the Europa League as the "lowest-placed" qualifier. If the League Cup winners had already qualified for European competitions through other methods, this reserved Europa League place was taken by the highest-placed team in the league which had not yet qualified for European competitions.

Teams
The labels in the parentheses show how each team qualified for the place of its starting round:
CW: Cup winners
2nd, 3rd, 4th, 5th, 6th, etc.: League position
LC: League Cup winners
RW: Regular season winners
PW: End-of-season Europa League play-offs winners
UCL: Transferred from the Champions League
GS: Third-placed teams from the group stage
PO: Losers from the play-off round
Q3: Losers from the third qualifying round
Q2: Losers from the second qualifying round
Q1: Losers from the first qualifying round
PR: Losers from the preliminary round (F: final; SF: semi-finals)

One team not playing a national top division took part in the competition; Vaduz (representing Liechtenstein) played in 2019–20 Swiss Challenge League, which is Switzerland's 2nd tier.

Notes

Round and draw dates
The schedule of the competition was as follows (all draws were held at the UEFA headquarters in Nyon, Switzerland, unless stated otherwise). Matches could also be played on Tuesdays or Wednesdays instead of the regular Thursdays due to scheduling conflicts.

The competition was suspended on 17 March 2020 due to the COVID-19 pandemic in Europe. A working group was set up by UEFA to decide the calendar of the remainder of the season. On 17 June 2020, UEFA announced the revised schedule for the quarter-finals, semi-finals and final of the competition, to be played in single-leg matches.

The original schedule of the competition, as planned before the pandemic, was as follows.

Effects of the COVID-19 pandemic
Due to the varying rates of transmission of COVID-19 across European countries during the time of the Round of 16 first leg ties, different matches were affected in different ways. Because of this severity of the COVID-19 pandemic in Italy at the time, the games involving Inter Milan and A.S. Roma were postponed, whereas games hosted in Greece, Germany, and Austria went ahead but behind closed doors. Games hosted in Turkey and Scotland went ahead as normal. On 15 March, UEFA announced that none of the Round of 16 second leg ties would go ahead in the following week, postponing them indefinitely, with a taskforce convened to reschedule the rest of the season. On 23 March, it was announced that the Stadion Energa Gdańsk in Gdańsk, Poland would no longer host the competition Final, originally scheduled for 27 May, but would host the 2021 Final instead.

On 17 June it was announced that the Europa League would return on 5 August and conclude on 21 August, with a last-eight tournament to be held across four venues in Germany. The remainder of the competition would be played in a mini-tournament style with remaining fixture to be played as single legged ties except for the Round of 16 fixtures where the first leg had already been played. All remaining ties of the competition were played behind closed doors due to the remaining presence of the COVID-19 pandemic in Europe.

Final tournament venues

Qualifying rounds

In the qualifying rounds and the play-off round, teams were divided into seeded and unseeded teams based on their 2019 UEFA club coefficients, and then drawn into two-legged home-and-away ties. Teams from the same association could not be drawn against each other.

Preliminary round
In the preliminary round, teams were divided into seeded and unseeded teams based on their 2019 UEFA club coefficients, and then drawn into two-legged home-and-away ties. Teams from the same association could not be drawn against each other.

First qualifying round

Second qualifying round
The second qualifying round was split into two separate sections: Champions Path (for league champions) and League Path (for cup winners and league non-champions).

Third qualifying round
The third qualifying round was split into two separate sections: Champions Path (for league champions) and League Path (for cup winners and league non-champions).

Play-off round

The play-off round was split into two separate sections: Champions Path (for league champions) and League Path (for cup winners and league non-champions).

Group stage

The draw for the group stage was held on 30 August 2019, 13:00 CEST, at the Grimaldi Forum in Monaco. The 48 teams were drawn into twelve groups of four, with the restriction that teams from the same association could not be drawn against each other. For the draw, the teams were seeded into four pots based on their 2019 UEFA club coefficients.

In each group, teams played against each other home-and-away in a round-robin format. The group winners and runners-up advanced to the round of 32, where they were joined by the eight third-placed teams of the 2019–20 UEFA Champions League group stage. The matchdays were 19 September, 3 October, 24 October, 7 November, 28 November, and 12 December 2019.

A total of 26 national associations were represented in the group stage. Espanyol, Ferencváros, LASK, Oleksandriya, Wolfsberger AC and Wolverhampton Wanderers made their debut appearances in the group stage (although Espanyol and Ferencváros had appeared in the UEFA Cup group stage).

Group A

Group B

Group C

Group D

Group E

Group F

Group G

Group H

Group I

Group J

Group K

Group L

Knockout phase

In the knockout phase, teams played against each other over two legs on a home-and-away basis, except for the one-match final.

Bracket

Round of 32

Round of 16

Quarter-finals

Semi-finals

Final

Statistics
Statistics exclude qualifying rounds and play-off round.

Top goalscorers

Notes

Top assists

Squad of the season
The UEFA technical study group selected the following 23 players as the squad of the tournament.

Notes

Player of the season
Votes were cast by coaches of the 48 teams in the group stage, together with 55 journalists selected by the European Sports Media (ESM) group, representing each of UEFA's member associations. The coaches were not allowed to vote for players from their own teams. Jury members selected their top three players, with the first receiving five points, the second three and the third one. The shortlist of the top three players was announced on 17 September 2020. The award winner was announced during the 2020–21 UEFA Europa League group stage draw in Switzerland on 2 October 2020.

Notes

See also
2019–20 UEFA Champions League
2020 UEFA Super Cup

Notes

References

External links

 
2
2019-20
Association football events postponed due to the COVID-19 pandemic